The 1928 Virginia Cavaliers football team represented the University of Virginia as a member of the Southern Conference (SoCon) during the 1928 college football season. Led by Greasy Neale in his sixth and final season as head coach, the Cavaliers compiled an overall record of 2–6–1 with a mark of 1–6 in conference play, tying for 20th place in the SoCon. The team played its games at Lambeth Field in Charlottesville, Virginia.

Schedule

References

Virginia
Virginia Cavaliers football seasons
Virginia Cavaliers football